Kibo Gauteng Thermal Power Station is a planned  thermal power station in South Africa. The power station is under development by a joint venture company called Sustineri Energy, co-owned by Kibo Energy, an Irish IPP and Industrial Green Energy Solutions (IGES) of South Africa. The energy generated here will be sold directly to a developer of industrial parks, based in Gauteng, South Africa, under a 10-year power purchase agreement (PPA) between the parties.

Location
The power station would be located in Gauteng Industrial Park, in Gauteng Province, where both Johannesburg, the country's business centre and Pretoria, South Africa's capital city are located.

Overview
The power station is being developed to supply baseline electricity to a developer of industrial parks in Gauteng Province, South Arica. The process involves the incineration of selected plastic waste at above  in the absence of oxygen, in a process called pyrolysis. This produces synthetic gas (syngas) and heat. The syngas is used to drive generators to produce electricity and the heat is sold to other industries in the industrial park.

It is anticipated that in 24 to 26 months, business will have picked up to warrant the expansion of the power station, tripling its output to 8 megawatts.

Developers
The owners/developers of this energy infrastructure have formed a joint venture company, named Sustineri Energy, which will own, design, finance, develop, build, operate and maintain this power station. The table below illustrates the shareholding in Sustineri Energy.

Construction and timeline
The construction of the power station is budgeted at ZAR:180 million (approx. US$12 million). Construction is expected to start in the second half of 2022 and last about 12 to 14 months. The engineering, procurement and construction (EPC) contract was awarded to Lesedi of South Africa. The same company was also selected as the "operations and management contractor".

See also

 List of power stations in South Africa
 Kinshasa Thermal Power Station
 Dandora Waste to Energy Power Station

References

External links
 Kibo Energy to build, operate waste-to-energy project in South Africa As of 14 February 2022.

Economy of Gauteng
Power stations in South Africa
Proposed energy infrastructure